Alexander Maxwell may refer to:
 Alexander Maxwell (politician)
 Alexander Maxwell (civil servant)
 Alexander Maxwell (bishop)